Jan Masoeng Sillo (28 November 1976 – 11 August 2009) was a South African professional football player for AmaZulu F.C.

Death 
Sillo died on 11 August 2009, when the car he was driving overturned on the N5 highway near Harrismith in the Free State. He had previously played for Bloemfontein Young Tigers and is survived by his wife and one child.

References

1976 births
2009 deaths
South African soccer players
Association football defenders
AmaZulu F.C. players
Road incident deaths in South Africa
Soccer players from the Free State (province)